The Castlefield Bowl (originally the Castlefield Events Arena and formerly the Castlefield Arena) is an outdoor events pavilion in the inner city conservation area of Castlefield in Manchester in North West England. The arena is often used for food festivals and music events.

The arena has played host to New Order, The Last Shadow Puppets, Bloc Party, The Strypes, Catfish and the Bottlemen, Noel Gallagher and The Courteeners. The Stone Roses frontman Ian Brown headlined New Years' Eve 1999, the first show at the pavilion.

In 2010, the arena was used as a Hyundai Fan Park showing all football matches from the 2010 FIFA World Cup.

In 2017, it played host to the city's 'Sounds Of The City' series of shows. Artists to perform included Arcade Fire, Blossoms, James, The Verve and Blink 182. Shed Seven, Hacienda Classical, Rag'n'Bone Man, Paul Heaton and Jacqui Abbott, and The Levellers played in 2018.

The National, Kylie Minogue and Bloc Party performed there in July 2019. Sounds of the City 2021 featured Crowded House, Foals, Lewis Capaldi, The Streets, Kaiser Chiefs, Razorlight, DMA's and Paul Heaton & Jacqui Abbott.

References

Music venues in Manchester